The Gibson ES-355 is the top of the line semi-hollow body thinline guitar from the Gibson Guitar Company. The guitar was a stereo guitar with a varitone circuit and it was manufactured from 1958 to 1982. In 2018 Gibson began producing version of the 355 again.

History
The Gibson ES-355 was created to be the fanciest of the Gibson thinline semi-hollow guitars. The first 355 appeared in 1958 as a mono ES-355TD. The majority of the 355s were manufactured as stereo guitars labeled ES-355TD-SV. The manufacture of the stereo versions appeared in 1959. Many guitarists did not appreciate the varitone and they disconnected the option so that the guitar could be played in mono.

Specifications
The guitar shipped in a mono version or a stereo version and it was the fineset of the gibson 300 series (ES-335, ES-345). The guitar shipped with an ebony fingerboard and pearl block inlays. There was a split diamond headstock inlay, and all of the hardware was gold plated. Many of the early versions of the guitar came with a Bigsby vibrato tailpiece. In 1960 Gibson offered a sideways vibrola option. The rarest version are the versions with the Stoptail bridge.

The top and back of the guitar was fitted with maple. The neck was mahogany and the tuners were either Grover Rotomatic or Kluson 'waffleback'. The top of the guitar featured two F Holes, and a center block to limit feedback that was often experienced with hollow guitars. The 355 shipped with two humbucker pickups. Another extremely rare version of the 355 is the ES-355TDN; which has a natural or blonde finish.

Reception
The guitar did not achieve the success that Gibson had hoped for. The ES-335 which was the stripped down version in the 300 series thinlines, was more popular. The 335 was lighter and simpler. The veritone circuit which was on the majority of 355s was not desired. Gibson ended production of the 355 in 1982. Gibson does produce a B.B. King Lucille model 355 and in 2016 produced an Alex Lifeson ES-355. In 2018 Gibson began producing an ES-355 with a Bigsby, an ES-355 in Walnut finish with a Maestro vibrola and an ES-355 Black Beauty.

Notable players
Alex Lifeson
B.B. King
Keith Richards
Noel Gallagher
Johnny Marr
Bernard Butler

References

Semi-acoustic guitars
ES-355
1958 musical instruments
1958 in music